The Benedictus (also Song of Zechariah or Canticle of Zachary), given in Gospel of , is one of the three canticles in the first two chapters of this Gospel, the other two being the "Magnificat" and the "Nunc dimittis". The Benedictus was the song of thanksgiving uttered by Zechariah on the occasion of the circumcision of his son, John the Baptist.

The canticle received its name from its first words in Latin ("Benedictus Dominus Deus Israel", “Blessed be the Lord God of Israel”).

Structure
The whole canticle naturally falls into two parts. The first (verses 68–75) is a song of thanksgiving for the realization of the Messianic hopes of the Jewish nation; but to such realization is given a characteristically Christian tone. As of old, in the family of David, there was power to defend the nation against their enemies, now again that of which they had been so long deprived, and for which they had been yearning, was to be restored to them, but in a higher and spiritual sense. The horn is a sign of power, and the "horn of salvation" signified the power of delivering or "a mighty deliverance". While the Jews had impatiently borne the yoke of the Romans, they had continually sighed for the time when the House of David was to be their deliverer. The deliverance was now at hand, and was pointed to by Zechariah as the fulfilment of God's oath to Abraham; but the fulfilment is described as a deliverance not for the sake of worldly power, but that "we may serve him without fear, in holiness and justice all our days".

The second part of the canticle is an address by Zechariah to his own son, who was to take so important a part in the scheme of the Redemption; for he was to be a prophet, and to preach the remission of sins before the coming of the Redeemer from on high.

Use in worship
The Pulpit Commentary refers to a belief that the Benedictus was "first introduced into the public worship of the Church about the middle of the sixth century by St. Caesarius of Arles".

In the Roman Catholic Church, the Benedictus is part of Lauds, probably because of the song of thanksgiving for the coming of the Redeemer in the first part of the canticle. It is believed to have been first introduced by Benedict of Nursia. According to Durandus, the allusion to Christ's coming under the figure of the rising sun had also some influence on its adoption. It also features in various other liturgical offices, notably at a funeral, at the moment of interment, when words of thanksgiving for the Redemption are specially in place as an expression of Christian hope.

It is one of the canticles in the Anglican service of Morning Prayer (or Matins) according to the Book of Common Prayer, where it is sung or said after the second (New Testament) lesson, unless Psalm 100 ("Jubilate Deo") is used instead. It may also be used as a canticle in the Lutheran service of Matins.

Texts

Greek

The Greek version of the canticle appears in the Gospel of Luke 1:68-79:

Εὐλογητὸς κύριος ὁ θεὸς τοῦ Ἰσραήλ,
ὁτι ἐπεσκέψατο καὶ ἐποίησεν λύτρωσιν τῷ λαῷ αὐτοῦ,
καὶ ἠγειρεν κέρας σωτηρίας ἡμῖν
ἐν οἴκῳ Δαυὶδ παιδὸς αὐτοῦ,
καθὼς ἐλάλησεν διὰ στόματος τῶν ἀγίων ἀπ' αἰῶνος προφητῶν αὐτοῦ,
σωτηρίαν ἐξ ἐχθρῶν ἡμῶν καὶ ἐκ χειρὸς πάντων τῶν μισούντων ἡμᾶς·
ποιῆσαι ἔλεος μετὰ τῶν πατέρων ἡμῶν
καὶ μνησθῆναι διαθήκης ἀγίας αὐτοῦ,
ὅρκον ὃν ὤμοσεν πρὸς Ἀβραὰμ τὸν πατέρα ἡμῶν,
τοῦ δοῦναι ἡμῖν
ἀφόβως ἐκ χειρὸς ἐχθρῶν ῥυσθέντας
λατρεύειν αὐτῷ ἐν ὁσιότητι
καὶ δικαιοσύνῃ ἐνώπιον αὐτοῦ πάσαις ταῖς ἡμέραις ἡμῶν.
Καὶ σὺ δέ, παιδίον, προφήτης ὑψίστου κληθήσῃ,
προπορεύσῃ γὰρ ἐνώπιον κυρίου ἑτοιμάσαι ὁδοὺς αὐτοῦ,
τοῦ δοῦναι γνῶσιν σωτηρίας τῷ λαῷ αὐτοῦ
ἐν ἀφέσει ἀμαρτιῶν αὐτῶν,
διὰ σπλάγχνα ἐλέους θεοῦ ἡμῶν,
ἐν οἷς ἐπισκέψεται ἡμᾶς ἀνατολὴ ἐξ ὑψους,
ἐπιφᾶναι τοῖς ἐν σκότει καὶ σκιᾷ θανάτου καθημένοις,
τοῦ κατευθῦναι τοὺς πόδας ἡμῶν εἰς ὁδὸν εἰρήνης.

Latin

English

International Commission on English in the Liturgy

Blessed be the Lord, the God of Israel;
he has come to his people and set them free.
He has raised up for us a mighty savior,
born of the house of his servant David.

Through his holy prophets he promised of old
that he would save us from our enemies,
from the hands of all who hate us.
He promised to show mercy to our fathers
and to remember his holy covenant.

This was the oath he swore to our father Abraham:
to set us free from the hands of our enemies,
free to worship him without fear,
holy and righteous in his sight all the days of our life.

You, my child, shall be called the prophet of the Most High;
for you will go before the Lord to prepare his way,
to give his people knowledge of salvation
by the forgiveness of their sins.

In the tender compassion of our God
the dawn from on high shall break upon us,
to shine on those who dwell in darkness and the shadow of death,
and to guide our feet into the way of peace.

The United Methodist Hymnal

Blessed be the Lord, the God of Israel,
who has come to set the chosen people free.
The Lord has raised up for us
a mighty Savior from the house of David.
Through the holy prophets, God promised of old
to save us from our enemies,
from the hands of all who hate us;
to show mercy to our forebears
and to remember the holy covenant.
This was the oath God swore to our father Abraham
to set us free from the hands of our enemies,
free to worship without fear,
holy and righteous in the Lord's sight,
all the days of our life.   R

and you, child, shall be called the prophet of the Most High,
for you will go before the Lord to prepare the way,
to give God's people knowledge of salvation
by the forgiveness of their sins.
In the tender compassion of our God
the dawn from on high shall break upon us,
to shine on those who dwell in the darkness and the shadow of death,
and to guide our feet into the way of peace.   R

New American Bible

Blessed be the Lord, the God of Israel,
for he has visited and brought redemption to his people.
He has raised up a horn for our salvation
within the house of David his servant,
even as he promised through the mouth of his holy prophets from of old:
salvation from our enemies and from the hand of all who hate us,
to show mercy to our fathers
and to be mindful of his holy covenant
and of the oath he swore to Abraham our father,
and to grant us that, rescued from the hand of enemies,
without fear we might worship him in holiness and righteousness
before him all our days.
And you, child, will be called prophet of the Most High,
for you will go before the Lord to prepare his ways,
to give his people knowledge of salvation
through the forgiveness of their sins,
because of the tender mercy of our God
by which the daybreak from on high will visit us
to shine on those who sit in darkness and death’s shadow,
to guide our feet into the path of peace.

Douay–Rheims
From the Douay–Rheims Bible (Challoner Revision):

Book of Common Prayer
From the 1662 Book of Common Prayer:

See also
 Dead Sea Scrolls 4Q521

References

External links

 List of available settings at Choral Public Domain Library.
 Order for Morning Prayer in the Book of Common Prayer
 Pope John Paul II, "Reflection on Canticle of Zechariah", General Audience, October 1, 2003

Attribution

Canticles
Gospel of Luke
Vulgate Latin words and phrases
New Testament Latin words and phrases